Louis Glenn Marson (born June 26, 1986) is an American former professional baseball catcher, who played in Major League Baseball (MLB) for the Philadelphia Phillies and Cleveland Indians, from  through . Marson also played in the 2008 Summer Olympics. He is currently the manager of the Los Angeles Angels’ Triple-A affiliate, the Salt Lake Bees, of the Pacific Coast League.

Minor leagues
The Philadelphia Phillies drafted Marson in the fourth round of the 2004 Major League Baseball Draft out of Coronado High School in Scottsdale, Arizona. During 2004, he played with the Gulf Coast League Phillies instructional league team, where he ended the season with a seven-game hitting streak. In 38 games, Marson amassed a total of 29 hits, including three doubles and four home runs, for a batting average of .257. He also stole four bases. During his first full season in the Phillies' system, Marson played with the A-level Batavia Muckdogs. He played 60 games for the short-season squad, batting .245 with five home runs and three triples. He also drew 27 bases on balls and hit .351 against left-handed pitchers.

Moving up to the South Atlantic League for the 2006 season, Marson had a team-leading five triples and four stolen bases, though his average fell to .243. He notched a four-hit game against the Hagerstown Suns, a four-RBI game in August against the Delmarva Shorebirds, and reached base safely in nearly every game in July. Marson had 85 hits in 350 at-bats in 2006 and added 29 walks for a .343 on-base percentage. Marson made his first appearance at the Phillies' spring training in 2007, after which he was assigned to the high-A Clearwater Threshers. He led the 2007 Threshers in batting average (.288) among qualifying players, hit 7 home runs and batted in 63 runs. He established himself as a solid fielder behind the plate, making only three errors in the final 37 games of the season and finishing with a fielding percentage of .982 for the season. After the 2007 season, Marson was recognized as one of the top ten prospects in the Phillies' minor league system by Baseball America.

In 2008, Marson won the Paul Owens Award as the top minor league player in the Phillies' farm system. In 94 games behind the plate for the AA Reading Phillies, Marson batted .314 with five home runs and 18 doubles. He also walked 68 times. For his efforts, he was named to both the midseason and post-season Eastern League All-Star teams. He led that league, and all AA-level leagues, in on-base percentage with a .433 mark and posted a 14-game hitting streak at the end of May, during which he had a grand slam and six RBI in one game. A converted infielder with a strong arm, he allowed 30 baserunners in 83 stolen-base attempts for a steal percentage of 36%. The Phillies purchased Marson's contract at the conclusion of the 2008 Eastern League season, and he was called up to the majors for the postseason stretch run. After the season, the Phillies' farm system director, Steve Noworyta, said that Marson "continues, like fine wine, to get better as he ages." His stock as a Baseball America prospect rose from eighth in the system to third, and he was named one of the top 50 prospects in Major League Baseball.

Marson and Reading teammate Jason Donald were selected to the United States national baseball team for the 2008 Olympics, where they won the bronze medal. National team manager Davey Johnson said that "[he] really impressed me during (the Futures Game)… He caught the first three innings. We don't give the signs to the catcher. He told (pitcher) Brett Anderson to throw over to first and he picked (a runner off). His numbers are outstanding for a catcher—great offensive catcher—and I got reports that said everything about him is good."

Major leagues

Philadelphia Phillies

Marson was called up to the Phillies on September 1, 2008. He had his first major league hit off of Odalis Perez on September 28 against the Washington Nationals. He later scored his first run in the same inning. In the same game, he also hit his first big league home run off Marco Estrada. This was on the final day of the 2008 season; though Marson was not included on the World Series-winning roster, he did travel with the team in case of injuries. He did receive a World Series ring, in spite of all this. After the end of the postseason, Marson participated in the Arizona Fall League, where he played for the Mesa Solar Sox.

Marson participated in the major league 2009 spring training with the Phillies, where veteran starter Jamie Moyer expressed his pleasure with Marson's skills and ability to call the game. Assistant GM Chuck LaMar said that "[his] strength has actually become his ability to run the game… That is unique for a converted catcher. We think he's one of the finest catching prospects in baseball." Marson was reassigned to the minor leagues on March 23, but was called up to the majors on April 11 to replace Carlos Ruiz, who injured his right oblique muscle. He went 1-for-4 in one game for the Lehigh Valley IronPigs before his call-up.

Cleveland Indians
On July 29, 2009, the Phillies traded Marson, along with Jason Donald, Carlos Carrasco, and Jason Knapp to the Cleveland Indians for Cliff Lee and Ben Francisco.

Over the next three seasons, Marson was a fixture behind the plate for Cleveland, playing in over 70 games in each of the 2010, 2011, and 2012 seasons—however, he struggled at the plate, never hitting higher than .230. After a 2013 season in which he only appeared in 3 games at the major league level, Marson was non-tendered by the Indians, becoming a free agent.

Cincinnati Reds
On December 18, 2013, the Reds signed Marson to a minor league contract, that included a spring training invitation. He was released on March 14, 2014. Marson signed a minor league deal with the Cincinnati Reds in May 2014.

Coaching career
Marson served as hitting coach of the Salt Lake Bees, the Los Angeles Angels' Triple-A affiliate, in 2017. The next year, he managed the Mobile BayBears, their Double-A affiliate. In 2019, the Angels named Marson the manager of Salt Lake.

References

External links

1986 births
Living people
Baseball coaches from Arizona
Baseball players from Scottsdale, Arizona
Major League Baseball catchers
Baseball players at the 2008 Summer Olympics
Olympic bronze medalists for the United States in baseball
Philadelphia Phillies players
Cleveland Indians players
Florida Complex League Phillies players
Batavia Muckdogs players
Lakewood BlueClaws players
Clearwater Threshers players
Reading Phillies players
Lehigh Valley IronPigs players
Columbus Clippers players
Akron Aeros players
Pensacola Blue Wahoos players
Medalists at the 2008 Summer Olympics
Mesa Solar Sox players
Minor league baseball coaches
Minor league baseball managers